Bhagey Gobardhan (31 October 1934 - 31 July 1993) was an Indian politician. He was elected to the Lok Sabha, the lower house of the Parliament of India as a member of the Janata Dal in 1989 he was disqualified from the Lok Sabha under the anti-defection law after he joined the Chandrasekhar government. He later joined the Indian National Congress and was reelected in 1991.

References

External links
Official biographical sketch in Parliament of India website

1934 births
1993 deaths
Lok Sabha members from Odisha
India MPs 1989–1991
India MPs 1991–1996
Janata Dal politicians
Indian National Congress politicians from Odisha
Janata Party politicians
Samajwadi Janata Party politicians
Indian Administrative Service officers